Tour Group is an American reality television series that premiered on March 1, 2016, on Bravo. Announced in April 2014, the docu-series follows a group of people leading by three expert tour guides as they travel around the world visiting locations in Morocco, Kenya, the Maldives, Sri Lanka, Thailand and Japan.

Episodes

References

External links

 
 
 

2010s American reality television series
2016 American television series debuts
Bravo (American TV network) original programming
English-language television shows